Johnny Doesn't Live Here Anymore is a 1944 American comedy/romance film starring Simone Simon, James Ellison, William Terry, and featuring Robert Mitchum in an early role. Produced by King Brothers Productions, it was co-written by Philip Yordan and directed by the German-American director Joe May, and constitutes the final film directed by Joe May. It was based on a short story purchased by the King Brothers. The film has fantasy elements, with the main character being followed by a gremlin.

The film's interest and charm derives in large part from its extremely varied cast of supporting players.  Although Robert Mitchum's role in the film has come to be emphasized for marketing purposes, he was not yet a star and only appears in the last twenty minutes or so of the film.  Horror film staple Rondo Hatton speaks no lines and gets a laugh merely by appearing on screen briefly in a surprise appearance.  Billy Laughlin, playing a child who lives in Simon's apartment building, was far better known at the time as "Froggy" in the Our Gang shorts, his only other film work also with a regular voice.

Plot
On a train headed from her home province of Quebec, Kathie Aumont accidentally spills salt.  Deeply superstitious, she believes this condemns her to seven weeks of bad luck.  She is correct, as she is thereafter pursued by a mischievous bad luck Gremlin named B.O. Rumpelstilskin (Jerry Maren, voiced by an uncredited Mel Blanc).
When she arrives at her destination, she finds that her friend Sally, with whom she was going to live, is newly married.  This leaves Kathie with nowhere to sleep.  Luckily she meets a newly inducted Marine Johnny. He gives her the key to his apartment and says she can stay there while he is away. Unluckily Johnny has also given keys to all his friends. Confusion, comedy and romance follows.

The wartime housing shortage in various large urban areas was a recurrent subject for American comedies during World War II.  This film was distinctive in that it was a comedy-fantasy.

Cast 
 Simone Simon as Kathie Aumont
 James Ellison as Mike Burke
 William Terry as Johnny Moore
 Minna Gombell as Mrs. Collins
 Chick Chandler as Jack
 Alan Dinehart as Judge
 Gladys Blake as Sally
 Robert Mitchum as CPO Jeff Daniels
 Dorothy Granger as Irene
 Grady Sutton as George
 Chester Clute as Mr. Collins
 Fern Emmett as Shrew
 Jerry Maren as Gremlin
 Janet Shaw as Gladys
 Charles Williams as Court Recorder
 Rondo Hatton as B. Graves, Undertaker
 Billy Laughlin as Jerry Malone

References

External links 
 
 
 
 

1944 films
Films directed by Joe May
Monogram Pictures films
1944 romantic comedy films
American romantic comedy films
American black-and-white films
Films about gremlins
1940s English-language films
1940s American films